Benjamin Hedericus (Benjamin Hederich; 12 December 1675 in Geithain, Germany – 18 July 1748 in Großenhain, Meißen, Germany) was a German lexicographer. He is most notable as the author of a Greek lexicon that was widely used in the Roman Catholic Church in Europe.

He also authored the following: 
 Notitia Auctorum Antiqua et Media
 Progymnasmata Linguae Graecae
 Progymnasmata Linguae Latinae
 Fasti Consulares Romani
 Reales Schul-Lexicon
 Lexicon Manuale Graecum - edited and expanded by Johann August Ernesti in 1767
 Grundliches Mythologisches Lexicon
 Lexicon Manuale Latino-Germanicum

He edited Empedocles' De Sphaera and a Latin edition of Tertullian.

Disambiguation
There was another similarly named individual, Dr Hedericus, who was a Lutheran pastor at Iglau, and an opponent of the Moravian Church in the 16th Century. 

Book editors
Lexicographers
Rhetoricians
Historians of antiquity
1675 births
1748 deaths